Cetotheriophanes is an extinct rorqual from the late Pliocene (Piacenzian) of northern Italy.

Classification 
Cetotheriophanes was originally described as a subgenus of Cetotherium in 1873, but later elevated to full generic status in 1875. It was later considered a synonym of Balaenoptera by some authors, but recent work suggests that Cetotheriophanes is distinct from Balaenoptera.

References

Sources 

 
 

Pliocene cetaceans
Prehistoric cetacean genera
Fossil taxa described in 1873
Pliocene mammals of Europe